Carlos Grave (born 7 June 1958) is a Portuguese equestrian. He competed in the individual eventing at the 2004 Summer Olympics.

References

External links
 

1958 births
Living people
Portuguese male equestrians
Olympic equestrians of Portugal
Equestrians at the 2004 Summer Olympics
People from Évora
Sportspeople from Évora District